Buffalo Island Central High School (or BIC) is a comprehensive public high school serving students in grades nine through twelve in Monette, Arkansas, United States. It serves the Blue Island area in Craighead County and is the sole high school administered by the Buffalo Island Central School District with its main feeder school as Buffalo Island Central Junior High School. In 2010, two administrators were recognized as Administrators of the Year by the Arkansas Scholastic Press Association (ASPA).

Curriculum 
The assumed course of study for BIC students is the Smart Core curriculum developed the Arkansas Department of Education (ADE), which requires students to complete 22 credit units before graduation. Students engage in regular and Advanced Placement (AP) coursework and exams.

Extracurricular activities 
The Buffalo Island Central High School mascot is the Mustang with school colors are navy blue and silver. The Buffalo Island Central Mustangs participate in various interscholastic activities in the 2A 3 (Basketball) Conference administered by the Arkansas Activities Association. The school athletic activities include basketball (boys/girls), cross country (boys/girls), soccer (boys only), track (boys/girls), golf (boys/girls), baseball, and softball.

In 2012 and 2015, the Lady Mustangs were Class 2A state finalists in softball.

In 2013, the boys golf team were the 2A State Champions, placing two individuals in the overall tournament.

Buffalo Island Central's journalism program has been recognized on the local, state and national level. Students in the program frequently win recognition at the Arkansas Scholastic Press Association's annual conventions. In 2013 and 2014, journalism staff members won nine Quill and Scroll National Yearbook Excellence Gold Keys and two Sweepstakes awards, and students won awards at the Journalism Education Association's national conventions in both 2013 and 2014.

References

External links 
 

Public high schools in Arkansas
Schools in Craighead County, Arkansas